H. D. Cerqueira de Souza (born in 1963 in Beira, Mozambique) studied Architecture at the Faculty of Architecture (Faculdade de Arquitectura ) of the University of Lisbon  (Universidade de Lisboa) from 1982 to 1987. Graduated in 1987 under the tutoring of Manuel Graça Dias, Architect. Studied Music Composition at the Regional Conservatory of Setúbal from 1988 to 1992.

Books and essays

150 years of Councilors in Vila Verde Paperback, 2005 (Portuguese)
150 anos de Autarcas em Vila Verde Brochado, 2005
Corruption and Incompetence in the defence and preservation of architectural heritage  Hardcover, 2006
Inventory of Tarouca Paperback, 2006
Five Portraits in City Hall:the Feyo Dynasty Paperback, 2008
Brief Carolingian Bibliography Hardcover, 2009
From Charlemagne to my Father Hardcover, 2009

References

Living people
1963 births
Technical University of Lisbon alumni